The 2002 United States Senate election in Alabama was held on November 5, 2002. Incumbent Republican U.S. Senator Jeff Sessions won re-election to a second term. As of 2022, this is the most recent Senate election in Alabama in which Colbert and Lawrence counties voted for the Democratic candidate.

Background 
In the 1968 presidential election, Alabama supported native son and American Independent Party candidate George Wallace over both Richard Nixon and Hubert Humphrey. Wallace was the official Democratic candidate in Alabama, while Humphrey was listed as the "National Democratic". In 1976, Democratic candidate Jimmy Carter from Georgia carried the state, the region, and the nation, but Democratic control of the region slipped after that.

Since 1980, conservative Alabama voters have increasingly voted for Republican candidates at the federal level, especially in presidential elections. By contrast, Democratic candidates have been elected to many state-level offices and comprised a longstanding majority in the Alabama Legislature.

Republican primary

Candidates 
 Jeff Sessions, incumbent U.S. Senator since 1997

Sessions was not challenged in the primary.

Democratic primary

Candidates 
 Julian L. McPhillips, Attorney and candidate for Attorney General in 1978
 Susan Parker, Alabama State Auditor
 Wayne Sowell, candidate for governor in 1998 and candidate for the U.S. House in 2000

Results 

Original on June 4

McPhillips won many counties in the southern part of the state, but Parker won the most counties. Sowell endorsed Parker for the runoff.

Runoff on June 25

General election

Candidates 
 Jeff Allen (L)
 Susan Parker (D), Alabama State Auditor
 Jeff Sessions (R), Incumbent U.S. Senator

Debates
Complete video of debate, October 20, 2002

Predictions

Results

See also 
 2002 United States Senate election

References 

2002 Alabama elections
2002
Alabama